Thomas Francis Gleeson (born 2 June 1974) is an Australian stand-up comedian, writer, television and radio presenter. Gleeson formerly co-hosted The Weekly with Charlie Pickering alongside Judith Lucy and currently hosts Hard Quiz, both on the Australian Broadcasting Corporation (ABC).

In 2019, Gleeson won the Gold Logie Award for Most Popular Personality on Television.

Early life
Gleeson was born in Gunnedah, New South Wales, and lived at nearby Tambar Springs before boarding at St. Joseph's College, Hunters Hill, in Sydney. He graduated from the University of Sydney with a Bachelor of Science in mathematics and physics. During his degree, Gleeson played the drums and occasionally sang vocals in an Australian band, the Fantastic Leslie, before leaving for a career in comedy.

Career

Comedy
Gleeson's first stage appearance was as the character "Malcolm" (for two years) dressed in a flannelette shirt, tracksuit pants and a wig. He later went on to perform at major comedy events including the Melbourne International Comedy Festival, Sydney Comedy Festival, Adelaide Fringe, Brisbane Comedy Festival, Perth Fringe World, Edinburgh Fringe and Montreal Comedy Festival.

In December 2007, Gleeson entertained Australian troops on active duty in Iraq and Afghanistan. He wrote of this experience in his book Playing Poker with the SAS: A comedy tour of Iraq and Afghanistan, which was published in October 2008.

Three of Gleeson's stand up shows have been nominated for the Helpmann Award for Best Comedy Performer: Tom On! (2007), Up Himself (2011) and Quality (2014).

His stand up show Joy (2019) won Best Comedy at Perth Fringe World.

His stand up show Lighten Up (2020) also won Best Comedy at the Adelaide Fringe.

Radio
From 2004 to 2005, Gleeson presented the Sydney and Melbourne evening radio program Tom & Subby with Subby Valentine on Triple M.

During 2009, Gleeson presented the Melbourne radio breakfast program Mix Mornings with Brigitte Duclos on Mix 101.1.

Television
In 2003 and 2004, Gleeson appeared in Network Ten's comedy sketch program skitHOUSE, playing various characters including the "Australian Fast Bowler", a parody of Dennis Lillee. In 2006, Gleeson won Australia's Brainiest Radio Star.  In 2008, he was a panelist on the short-lived Big Brother's Big Mouth. In 2009, Gleeson was in the "They don't get it in Australia" advertising campaign, where he asks people in the United States about Red Rooster. Gleeson also made several appearances on Good News Week between 2008 and 2011.

In 2013, Gleeson co-hosted Australian comedy chat show This Week Live with Tommy Little, Dave Thornton and Meshel Laurie. In 2015, Gleeson appeared on the ABC satirical television news program The Weekly with Charlie Pickering, hosting the segments "This Is What You Think", "Go Away" and "Hard Chat". In 2016, he began presenting Hard Quiz, a spin-off of his "Hard Chat" segment from The Weekly. In 2017, Gleeson was credited for the decision to cast Sophie Monk as the lead in The Bachelorette Australia. Gleeson will host the upcoming Australian version of Taskmaster.
In 2022 he performed in a celebrity tribute to Australian comedian and actor Paul Hogan, Roast of Paul Hogan, which was broadcast on Australia’s Seven Network.

Awards and nominations

ARIA Music Awards
The ARIA Music Awards are a set of annual ceremonies presented by Australian Recording Industry Association (ARIA), which recognise excellence, innovation, and achievement across all genres of the music of Australia. They commenced in 1987. 

! 
|-
| 2020 || Joy ||  ARIA Award for Best Comedy Release ||  || 
|-

Logie Awards

! 
|-
| 2019
| Tom Gleeson
| Gold Logie
| 
| 
|}

References

External links
Official website
 

1974 births
Australian stand-up comedians
Australian male comedians
Comedians from Melbourne
Gold Logie winners
Living people
People educated at St Joseph's College, Hunters Hill
People from Sydney
University of Sydney alumni